The following are the national records in speed skating in Chile.

Men

Women

References

National records in speed skating
Speed skating-related lists
Speed skating
Speed skating
Chile